Motorenfabrik Paul Baer GmbH was a German engine and automobile manufacturer.

The company was founded in Berlin 1908 to make engines which were supplied to several early automobile manufacturers. Between 1920 and 1926, a small car was built in the city under the brand Baer.

The 4/14 hp car was powered by a 770cc two-cylinder two-stroke engine.

One of the vehicle took part in the small car race at the AVUS in Berlin in 1923.

Gallery

Literature 
 George Nicholas Georgano (Editor-in-chief.): The Beaulieu Encyclopedia of the Automobile. Band 1: A–F. Fitzroy Dearborn Publishers, Chicago 2001, ISBN 1-57958-293-1. (English).
 Werner Oswald: Deutsche Autos 1920–1945. 10th edition, Motorbuch Verlag, Stuttgart 1996, ISBN 3-87943-519-7, p. 434 (German).

References 

Defunct motor vehicle manufacturers of Germany
Manufacturing companies based in Berlin
Companies of Prussia
Vehicle manufacturing companies established in 1920
Vehicle manufacturing companies disestablished in 1926